The Aquilair Swing is a French ultralight trike that was designed and produced by Aquilair of Theizé. When it was available the aircraft was supplied as a complete ready-to-fly-aircraft.

As of May 2013 the Swing was no longer advertised in the company catalog of aircraft offered.

Design and development
It features a cable-braced hang glider-style high-wing, weight-shift controls, a two-seats-in-tandem open cockpit, tricycle landing gear with wheel pants on the main wheels and a single engine in pusher configuration.

The aircraft is made from metal tubing, with its double surface wing covered in Dacron sailcloth. The initial wing used was the La Mouette Swing 14,  from which the aircraft takes its name. In 2010 the La Mouette Ipsos 14.9 wing was introduced  instead of the Swing wing. The  span wing is supported by a single tube-type kingpost and uses an "A" frame weight-shift control bar. The standard powerplant supplied was the twin cylinder, liquid-cooled, two-stroke, dual-ignition  Rotax 582, with the  two cylinder, horizontally-opposed  Verner VM133MK engine optional.

Incorporated features include rigid seats, a high engine thrust line, a low centre of gravity and elbow-height control bar and a full cockpit fairing.

Specifications (Swing with Swing 14 wing)

References

2000s French sport aircraft
2000s French ultralight aircraft
Single-engined pusher aircraft
Ultralight trikes
Aquilair aircraft